Golitsyn may refer to:

Places
Golitsyn (crater), a lunar crater

People
Golitsyn family noble family
Dmitry Golitsyn (1771–1844), Russian cavalry general prominent during the Napoleonic Wars and Governor of Moscow for 25 years
Nikolai Golitsyn (1850–1925), last Tsarist prime minister of Russia
Mikhail Mikhailovich Golitsyn (1675-1721), general
many others listed in Golitsyn family
Anatoliy Golitsyn (born 1926), Soviet KGB defector
Georgy Golitsyn (born 1935), Soviet physicist and writer on nuclear winter

See also
 :Category:Galitzine family